Gordon Ramsey (June 19, 1930 – November 5, 1993) was an American actor and singer, who was based in New York City.

Early life
Ramsey was born in Minneapolis, on June 19, 1930.

Career
After moving to New York in 1958, Ramsey made his acting debut in the Off-Broadway theater musical, The Man Who Never Died.

Some of his notable performances included hosting a local children's television show as "Bozo the Clown" and voicing characters in the animated series Star Blazers. He appeared in the 1979 Broadway musical Carmelina and sang on the show's original cast recording.

In a 1969 episode of the TV show What's My Line?, Ramsey appeared as Bozo the Clown as a Mystery Guest. Later in the same episode, Ramsey appeared as himself without the clown makeup, requiring the panel to guess his line, which celebrity panelist Phyllis Newman did.

Personal life
He had three children with his wife Barbara Ramsey (née Brown).

Death
Ramsey died at his home in Grymes Hill, Staten Island on November 5, 1993, of cancer, at the age of 63.

Filmography

Film

Television

References

External links
 

American male musical theatre actors
American male television actors
American television personalities
Male television personalities
Place of birth missing
Place of death missing
1930 births
1993 deaths
20th-century American male actors
20th-century American singers
20th-century American male singers